John Jones, Talysarn (1 March 1796 – 16 August 1857), was a Welsh Calvinistic Methodist minister, regarded as one of the greatest preachers in the history of Wales.  Because the name "John Jones" was one of the most common in Wales at the time, he is usually differentiated by others of the same name by the use of the suffix "Talysarn", denoting the village where he lived.

Life
John Jones was born in a house called Tanycastell, in Dolwyddelan, and brought up in a farming family but which also had many connections with Nonconformist religion. He was a monoglot Welsh language speaker, and the only formal education he received was at the Sabbath school.

As a young man around 1820 he was engaged as a labourer building Thomas Telford's road from London to Holyhead (now known as the A5), and was heard by his fellow workers preaching on religious matters as he walked to work. In 1822 he moved to Talysarn to find work in the quarry, but was increasingly devoting himself to preaching. He was ordained in 1829, and would become widely known by the name "John Jones, Talysarn", after his adopted home village.

He married Frances (Fanny) Edwards around this time and left the quarry as they kept a shop together - although in practice it was she who understood business and kept the shop, so that he could devote time to matters of religion.

Between 1850 and 1852 he was a joint owner of the Dorothea Quarry but did not like this occupation.

He died on 16 August 1857 and was buried at the parish graveyard in Llanllyfni. In the funeral procession were 8 doctors, 65 ministers, 70 deacons, 200 choristers and around 4,000 others with a further 2,000 who joined en route.

His work
In an age when Nonconformist preaching had been riven by doctrinal differences, John Jones spoke plainly on matters that concerned the common people. They considered him one of their own, which was the foundation of his widespread appeal. Martyn Lloyd-Jones described him as "a thorough gospel man", and found him very influential.

He was also a singer, and composed the hymn tune Llanllyfni.

Genealogy
John Jones was a member of a large family which has gone to some trouble, before and since, to record its genealogy. Both his father and mother were descended from the poet Angharad James. In the mid-nineteenth century several of his brothers and sisters and their offspring emigrated to the area around Cambria, Wisconsin, United States.

References

Bibliography
 W. R. Ambrose (1871), Hynafiaethau, Cofiannau a Hanes Presennol Nant Nantlle, y Traethawd Buddugol yn Eisteddfod Gadeiriol Pen-y-groes
 Cledwyn Jones (2003), Mi Wisga'i Gap Pig Gloyw, John Glyn Davies, 1870-1953 Gwasg Pantycelyn 
 O. Llew Owain (1907), Cofiant Mrs Fanny Jones, gweddw y diweddar Barch. J. Jones, Talysarn cyhoeddwyd gan Mrs Jones, Cambrian House, Machynlleth.
 Griffith Owen (1896), Cadwaladr Owen, Hughes and Son, Wrexham
 G. T Roberts, John Jones Tal-y-Sarn (1796-1857), Trafodion Cymdeithas Hanes Sir Gaernarfon, cyfrol 18 (1957)
 Owen Thomas, D.D. (1874), Cofiant y Parchedig John Jones, Talsarn, Wrexham

External links
 Online Translated Extract of Biography
 Portrait at the National Library of Wales
 Slatesite
 Genealogy Story Link

1796 births
1857 deaths
Welsh Methodist ministers
19th-century Welsh clergy
19th-century Methodists